Me Llaman Lolita was a Colombian telenovela between 1999 and 2000.  It was written by Juan Manuel Cáceres and Jorge Elkim Ospina and directed by Luis Alberto Restrepo. This telenovela lasted 198 episodes and internationally it had 99 episodes. Starring Carla Giraldo, Manuela González and Marcelo Cezán. The antagonists were Marcela Gallego and Germán Castelblanco.

The series caused some controversy due to its depiction of the romance between Lolita, aged 12 at the start of the series, and Esteban, who is 18 years her senior, which led to the series being censored in Nicaragua and in Guatemala when it was transmitted in those countries.

Plot
Since the birth of Dolores, Lolita falls in love with Esteban and through her mother expresses this in all possible ways. But while Lolita does this, Dolores cannot be indifferent to the attributes of Esteban. The distrust of Rigoberto, the husband of Dolores, obligates Lolita and to Esteban to be separated for many years, without knowing about the immense love that she feels for him. But destiny and the eagerness of revenge pushes him again, this time to live a series of adventures and to be protected from common enemies. But his affection isn't enough, and they are obligated to be separated again, this time for six years, sufficient time so that she is a finished woman, and he understands that Lolita is the only woman in his life... but perhaps a forbidden woman for him, thereby making their love sinful.

Cast

Main 
 Manuela González as Lolita Rengifo Collazos
 Carla Giraldo as Teenage Lolita Rengifo Collazos
 Marcela Gallegoas Carmen Bocanegra de Rengifo
 Zharick León as Margarita "Margara"
 Marcelo Cezán as Esteban Buenahora
 Germán Castelblanco as Rigoberto Rengifo / Édgar Rengifo
 Jennifer Steffens as Eva Bocanegra
 Santiago Moure as Wallberto "Beto" Bocanegra
 Julián Román as Eulalio "Lalo" Bocanegra
 Nórida Rodríguez as Alicia Collazos
 Luis Eduardo Arango as Johnni Caicedo
 Toto Vega as Óscar "Osquitar" Collazos
 Juan Pablo Franco as Iván Banderas
 Lucas Nieto as Diego Mondragón
 Sandra Reyes as Constanza Victoria "Connie"

Co-Starting 
 Valentina Rendón as Sol Ángela Posada Jaramillo
 Víctor Hugo Cabrera as Pacho Minguez
 John Jairo Jaimes as Teenage Diego Mondragón
 Diego Vásquez as Humberto Antonio Corredor Santofimio
 Jhon Bolívar as Henry Blandón
 Miguel Ángel Báes as José María "Pepito" Mahecha 
 Víctor Hugo Trespalacios as Jairo "Rulos" Patiño 
 Diana Galeano as Lucy de Blandón
 Alcira Gil as Pureza
 Jimmy Vázquez as Julián
 Eduardo Chavarro as Pedro
 Moisés Rivillas as Moisés
 Humberto Arango as Alirio " El Iluminado"
 Julio Correal as Dr. Neira
 Beto Arango as El Oso

Special participations 
 María Fernanda Martínez as Dolores Collazos
 Yuri Pedraza as Magdalena Mondragón
 David Ramírez as Jair 
 Gustavo Angarita Jr. as William
 María Irene Toro as Clemencia 
 Paulo Sánchez Neira
 Rey Vásquez

Awards
16th India Catalina Awards, presented by the Cartagena Film Festival (2000)
 Best Principal Actor (Marcelo Cézan)

9th Colombian TVyNovelas Awards (2001)
 Best Telenovela of the Year
 Best Supporting Actress (Marcela Gallego)
 Best Female Newcomer (Carla Giraldo)

References

1990s Colombian television series
1999 Colombian television series debuts
1999 Colombian television series endings
1999 telenovelas
Colombian telenovelas
Spanish-language telenovelas